Kamatari may refer to:

 Fujiwara no Kamatari (614–669), the founder of the Fujiwara clan
 Kamatari Fujiwara (1905–1985), a Japanese actor
 Honjō Kamatari, a character from Rurouni Kenshin
 Kamatari (jitsu), the summoning animal of Temari (Naruto) in Naruto